Standesamt Margonin was a civil registration district (Standesamt) located in Kreis Kolmar, Posen of the German Empire (1871–1918) and administered 21 communities.

Bud = Budsin; Kol = Kolmar; Mar = Margonin; Wil = Wilhelmstreu

Geography 
Margonin was on the north end of a finger lake, where a mill stream emptied the lake into the Netze (Polish: Noteć) River. The Margonin lake dominated the southern portion of the area, blocking east–west traffic. North of Margonin lay Standesamt Samotschin. A bridge crossed the river, providing access to southern Kreis Wirsitz. West of Margonin, the road and railroad diverged on their way to Kreis' seat of Kolmar (Chodziesen; Polish: Chodzież). 

The railroad swung north to Samotschin before following the bluff overlooking the river plain. The road ran westward and then swung north to follow the railroad through to Kolmar. In the other direction, the road and railroad ran east and a little south, towards Gollantsch and Kreis Exin, passing through the strip of Kreis Wongrowitz that claims a small piece of the Netze riverbank. The only major road to the south exited Margonin at the southeast, and arched east on its way to the town of Wongrowitz, seat of its Kreis.

Woods sheltered the east of the lake, ran northeast past the Margoninsdorf estate and forestry school, and northwest, on the western side of the stream. Several mills shared the stream there. Aside from the mills, very little industry existed, save from weavers in the early days, and some brewing, conducted by the small Jewish population.

Margonin was a market town, and had churches for all three faiths. The Catholic parish church belonged to the deanery of Czarnikau, which was part of the Posen diocese.

The town suffered destruction by the Swedes, by floods, and cholera.

References 

Civil registration offices in the Province of Posen